Sang Koti (also Romanized as Sang Kotī) is a village in Balatajan Rural District, in the Central District of Qaem Shahr County, Mazandaran Province, Iran. At the 2006 census, its population was 518, in 149 families.

References 

Populated places in Qaem Shahr County